X16 may refer to:

x16, a mistaken reference to 16-bit computing
Bell X-16, high altitude reconnaissance jet aircraft designed in the United States in the 1950s
Jaguar C-X16, concept hybrid electric sports car unveiled by Jaguar Cars at the 2011 Frankfurt motor show
Rolls-Royce Eagle (X-16) or Rolls-Royce Eagle XVI, a 1925 British experimental 16 cylinder aero engine 
SJ X16 and X17, a series of electric railcars operated by Statens Järnvägar (SJ) of Sweden
X16 (New York City bus), former New York City Transit bus route

es:X16